

The Kamerton-N Ratnik is a 1990s Russian light autogyro designed and built by Kamerton-N Ltd of Shchyolkovo.

Design and development
The Ratnik, with an enclosed glazed cabin and side-by-side configuration seating for two, was developed by Kamerton-N in partnership with the Chkalov Air Force Science and Research Institute. The Ratnik has a two-blade main rotor and is powered by a  Samson 760 piston engine driving a pusher propeller inside a duct ring, the rudder is also mounted inside the duct. The autogyro started flight trials in 1995.

Specifications

See also

References

Notes

Bibliography

1990s Soviet and Russian civil utility aircraft
Single-engined pusher autogyros
Aircraft first flown in 1995